Have a Heart is a 1934 American drama film directed by David Butler and written by Florence Ryerson and Edgar Allan Woolf. The film stars Jean Parker, James Dunn, Una Merkel, Stuart Erwin and Willard Robertson. The film was released on September 7, 1934, by Metro-Goldwyn-Mayer.

Plot
Sally is a dance teacher who, right before her wedding, has her leg crippled in an accident. Her fiancé breaks off the engagement. She begins a new job making dolls in her home, and sits by her window as she works. From her window seat she meets Jimmie, who sells Have-a-Heart ice cream pops to neighborhood children. The couple fall in love.

When she learns that Jimmie has been accused of stealing $400 from work Sally takes most of the money she's been saving for an operation and gives it to Jimmie's boss. When Jimmie learns what Sally has done he is upset that she appears to believe he is guilty, so he decides to end their romance.

The real thief is caught, and Sally has her money returned to her, so she is able to have the operation, but she lacks the will to relearn how to walk. Jimmie returns, giving her the motivation to recover, and the couple are married.

Cast 
Jean Parker as Sally Moore
James Dunn as James 'Jimmie' Flaherty
Una Merkel as Joan O'Day
Stuart Erwin as Gus Anderson
Willard Robertson as Mr. Schauber
Samuel S. Hinds as Dr. Spear
Paul Page as Joe Lacy
Muriel Evans as Helen
Kate Price as Mrs. Kelly
Pepi Sinoff as Mrs. Abrahams

Production
Eighteen child performers from the Meglin School were in the cast.

References

External links 
 

1934 films
1930s English-language films
American drama films
1934 drama films
Metro-Goldwyn-Mayer films
Films directed by David Butler
American black-and-white films
Films with screenplays by Florence Ryerson
Films with screenplays by Edgar Allan Woolf
1930s American films